In Greek mythology, the Doliones (Ancient Greek: Δολίονες) or Dolionians were the people living on the coast of the Propontis (northwestern Asia Minor), visited by the Argonauts. They were ruled by Cyzicus, son of Aeneus and Aenete.

Mythology 
After the departure of the Argonauts in Lemnos, they came to the land of the Doliones of whom Cyzicus was the king. Cyzicus welcomed the Argonauts on their journey to Colchis and received them with generous hospitality. But after their departure, a storm drove them back to the Cyzicene coast at night. With neither the Argonauts nor King Cyzicus and the Doliones recognizing one another, each mistook the other as an enemy and battle ensued (according to Apollonius of Rhodes' Argonautica and Apollodorus' Library, the Doliones thought the returning Argonauts were a Pelasgian army who constantly harassed them). A fragment attributed to 4th century BCE historian Ephorus in the Scholia on Apollonius of Rhodes Argonautica, however, names the Doliones a Pelasgian people. The Argonauts slew many natives, including King Cyzicus who was killed either by Jason or Heracles.

List of Dolionians

Notes

References 

 Apollodorus, The Library with an English Translation by Sir James George Frazer, F.B.A., F.R.S. in 2 Volumes, Cambridge, MA, Harvard University Press; London, William Heinemann Ltd. 1921. . Online version at the Perseus Digital Library. Greek text available from the same website.
Apollonius Rhodius, Argonautica translated by Robert Cooper Seaton (1853-1915), R. C. Loeb Classical Library Volume 001. London, William Heinemann Ltd, 1912. Online version at the Topos Text Project.
 Apollonius Rhodius, Argonautica. George W. Mooney. London. Longmans, Green. 1912. Greek text available at the Perseus Digital Library.
 Gaius Valerius Flaccus, Argonautica translated by Mozley, J H. Loeb Classical Library Volume 286. Cambridge, MA, Harvard University Press; London, William Heinemann Ltd. 1928. Online version at theio.com.
 Gaius Valerius Flaccus, Argonauticon. Otto Kramer. Leipzig. Teubner. 1913. Latin text available at the Perseus Digital Library.

Characters in the Argonautica
Anatolian characters in Greek mythology
Legendary tribes in Greco-Roman historiography